Santos Peak is a peak lying south of Murray Island, on the west coast of Graham Land. Charted by the Belgian Antarctic Expedition under Gerlache, 1897–99. Named by the United Kingdom Antarctic Place-Names Committee (UK-APC) in 1960 for Alberto Santos-Dumont (1873–1932), Brazilian inventor resident in France, who designed and flew 14 small airships and accomplished the first official powered flight in Europe in 1906.

External links
 Santos Peak. Copernix satellite image

Mountains of Graham Land
Danco Coast
Things named after Alberto Santos-Dumont